Banneville-sur-Ajon is a former commune in the Calvados department in the Normandy region of north-western France. On 1 January 2016, it was merged into the new commune of Malherbe-sur-Ajon.

The inhabitants of the commune are known as Bannevillais or Bannevillaises.

Geography
Banneville-sur-Ajon is located some 20 km south-west of Caen and 7 km south-east of Villers-Bocage. Access to the commune is by the D121A from Saint-Agnan-le-Malherbe in the south which passes through the centre of the commune and the village and continues north to join the D8. The D171 from Landes-sur-Ajon to Préaux-Bocage passes through the north-east of the commune. Apart from the village there are the hamlets of La Fêterie in the south and Gournay in the north. The commune is almost all farmland.

The Ajon river flows through the commune from south-east to north-west continuing to join the Odon south-west of Le Locheur. The Orgeuil river rises in the south of the commune and flows north-east through the length of the commune to join the Ajon. The Ruisseau de la Rette flows from the south to join the Orgeuil.

Toponymy
Banneville-sur-Ajon was Barneville sur Ajon in 1371. René Lepelley attributed the origin of the name to the Germanic anthroponym Benno with the Old French suffix -ville meaning "rural domain".

Administration

List of Successive Mayors

Demography
In 2012 the commune had 383 inhabitants.

Sites and monuments

The Chapel of Saint-Clair (13th century) is registered as an historical monument. The church is built on a simple rectangular plan. On the tympanum of the south portal there is a figure in bas-relief of Saint Samson on his throne, and inside is a statue of Saint Clair.
The Church of Saint-Melaine is in neo-Gothic style from the late 19th century.
A replica of the grotto of Lourdes was built at a place called Le Village at the end of the Second World War.

Chapel Picture Gallery

See also
Communes of the Calvados department

References

External links

Benneville fur Ajon on the 1750 Cassini Map

Former communes of Calvados (department)
Populated places disestablished in 2016